Jimmy Owens (also referred to as Young Man on the Move) is an album by trumpeter Jimmy Owens recorded and released by the A&M/Horizon label in 1976.

Reception 

In his review on Allmusic, Richard S. Ginell notes "There was a time when Jimmy Owens was being positioned as the coming superstar of the jazz trumpet, signed to A&M's contemporary-thinking Horizon label as a leader and jumping into the thick of the jazz-funk scene ... Owens sails above the churning mix with a slender, lightish tone that nevertheless has a steel thread running through it. The combination works intermittently, alas".

Track listing 
All compositions by Jimmy Owens except where noted
 "Caravan" (Duke Ellington, Juan Tizol, Irving Mills) − 10:02
 "What's the Use"  - 10:02
 "Do It to It" − 6:21
 "Secret Love" (Sammy Fain, Paul Francis Webster) − 8:20
 "My Life" (Chris White) − 6:10

Personnel 
Jimmy Owens – trumpet, flugelhorn
Kenny Barron – piano, electric piano, clavinet, synthesizer
Chris White − bass, electric bass
Brian Brake – drums
George Davis (tracks 1-3 & 5), Lloyd Davis (tracks 1 & 2), Carl Lynch (track 3) − guitar
Warren Smith − percussion (tracks 1-3)

References 

Jimmy Owens (musician) albums
1976 albums
Horizon Records albums
A&M Records albums